This is a list of notable West Coast hip hop music record labels.

  Rappers Rapp Records founded by Duffy Hooks III & Jerry Hooks Sr. in 1981.
 Ruthless Records founded by Eazy-E and Jerry Heller in 1986
 Sick Wid It Records founded by E-40 in 1989
 Lench Mob Records founded by Ice Cube in 1990
 Death Row Records founded by Dr. Dre and Suge Knight in 1991
 Doggystyle Records founded by Snoop Dogg in 1995
 Open Bar Entertainment founded by Xzibit in 1995
 Aftermath Entertainment founded by Dr. Dre in 1996
 Hoo-Bangin' Records founded by Mack 10 in 1996
 Thizz Entertainment founded by Mac Dre in 1996
 Villain Entertainment founded by MC Ren in 1999
 Amaru Entertainment founded by Afeni Shakur in 1997
 The Black Wall Street Records founded by The Game and Big Fase 100 in 2002
 Top Dawg Entertainment founded by Anthony "Top Dawg" Tiffith in 2004
 Outlaw Recordz founded by Outlawz
 Odd Future founded by Tyler, The Creator, Hodgy Beats, Casey Veggies, Left Brian, Matt Martian, and Jasper Dolphin

See also
 

Record labels
Hip hop
Hip hop
American music-related lists